The Greater Toronto Airports Authority (GTAA) operates Toronto Pearson International Airport in Mississauga, Ontario, west of Toronto, Ontario, Canada. Toronto Pearson is Canada's largest airport facility with a traffic of 49.5 million passengers in 2018. The authority's headquarters are on the airport grounds, at 6301 Silver Dart Drive.

The GTAA was formed in 1996 by the Government of Canada, which was divesting its direct control of airports across the country to similar operating agencies. Previously, Pearson was operated directly by a ministry of the Government of Canada. Its mission is to operate the airport in a self-sufficient fashion. It receives its revenues from landing fees on airlines, departure fees on passengers, parking revenues and facility rentals. The revenues are used for operating and capital expenses. The GTAA completed a  billion redevelopment of Toronto Pearson from 1998 to 2008 to enable the airport to handle increases in traffic into the future.

The GTAA, despite its name, only operates the single airport, Toronto Pearson. A second international airport (Pickering Airport) was proposed for the north-east of Toronto but has not been built. Billy Bishop Toronto City Airport, Toronto's only other international airport with regularly scheduled flights, is operated by the separate federally-regulated agency PortsToronto.

See also

 Toronto Pearson International Airport
 History of Toronto Pearson International Airport
 Union Pearson Express
 LINK Train
 GTAA Cogeneration Plant
 Transport Canada
 Bombardier Aerospace

References

Companies based in Mississauga
Transport in the Greater Toronto Area
Airport operators of Canada
GTAA
Toronto Pearson International Airport
1996 establishments in Ontario